Muru Qullu (Aymara muru truncated, qullu mountain, "truncated mountain", also spelled Moro Kkollu) is a  mountain in Bolivia. It is located in the Potosí Department, Antonio Quijarro Province, Porco Municipality. It lies southwest of Warawara Lake.

References 

Mountains of Potosí Department